Jetlag Productions was an American animation studio that, like the similar studio Golden Films, has created a number of animated films based on different, popular children's stories, while creating a few original productions. Produced mainly for the American market, the films were animated in Japan by KKC&D Asia and Animal Ya among South Korean companies. They were later released directly to VHS through the GoodTimes Home Video distribution company. Years later, with the introduction of DVD, a newer department of the same company, GoodTimes Home Entertainment, distributed the films in that format. The films in Jetlag's catalog were dubbed into many different languages and were distributed by international departments of the GoodTimes corporation. Since 2005, the Gaiam company has held the copyrights to Jetlag Productions' animated films, following GoodTimes Entertainment's bankruptcy.

History 
Jetlag Productions started out as a small animation company, assisting in the productions of such series as The New Adventures of He-Man and Heroes on Hot Wheels in 1990, and Conan the Adventurer in 1992, until it was approached by Joe, Ken, and Stan Cayre (known artistically as the Cayre Brothers) of GoodTimes Entertainment.  The company then replaced Golden Films as GoodTimes' provider of budget animated productions, when the contract with that company expired. Under the name of their new establishment, the Cayre Brothers produced Children's Classics, a series of animated films that were very similar to those from Golden Films in style. Beginning their releases in 1994, Jetlag Productions produced a total of seventeen different animated films, thirteen adaptations of existing material, and four original features. All seventeen films were around 45 minutes in length, and were released as direct-to-video VHS features, under the "GoodTimes" name by GoodTimes Home Video. Their last release was The Hunchback of Notre Dame, which was released on April 30, 1996, just before GoodTimes turned to a new company, Blye Migicovsky Productions, for their new line of animation releases. Jetlag Productions' films were revived on DVD under a "Collectible Classics" label in 2002 by GoodTimes Entertainment. The new releases were widely available until GoodTimes filed for bankruptcy in 2005 and all assets were transferred to Gaiam.

Title listing

Fairy tale and short story adaptations 
Cinderella (1994), based on Charles Perrault's fairy tale and also on The Brothers Grimm's 1697 and 1812 fairy tale
Jungle Book (1995), based on the "Mowgli" stories from Rudyard Kipling's 1894 short story collection
Little Red Riding Hood (1995), based on Charles Perrault's fairy tale and also on the Brothers Grimm's 1697 and 1812 fairy tale
The Nutcracker (1995), based on E. T. A. Hoffmann's 1816 short story
Sleeping Beauty (1995), based on Charles Perrault's fairy tale and also on the Brothers Grimm's 1697 and 1812 fairy tale
Snow White (1995), based on The Brothers Grimm's 1812 fairy tale

Myths and legends adaptations 
Pocahontas (1994), also known as The Adventures of Pocahontas: Indian Princess, based on the life of Pocahontas
Hercules (1995), based on the legendary hero from Greek mythology

Literary novel adaptations 
A Christmas Carol (1994), based on Charles Dickens's 1843 novella
Alice in Wonderland (1995), based on Lewis Carroll's 1865 novel
Black Beauty (1995), based on Anna Sewell's 1877 novel
Heidi (1995), based on Johanna Spyri's 1880 novel
The Hunchback of Notre Dame (1996), based on Victor Hugo's 1831 novel

Original works 
Happy, the Littlest Bunny (1994), written by Larry Hartstein
Leo the Lion: King of the Jungle (1994), written by George Bloom
Curly, the Littlest Puppy (1995), written by Larry Hartstein
Magic Gift of the Snowman (1995), written by Larry Hartstain

TV series 
The New Adventures of He-Man (1990)
Heroes on Hot Wheels (1990)
Conan the Adventurer (1992)

Music 
Unlike its predecessor Golden Films, Jetlag Productions did not rely on familiar classical compositions as the soundtrack to their films (the only exception would be Heidi, which featured a variation of Edvard Grieg's "Morning Mood").  Instead, a variety of original compositions were created from scratch, produced by Andrew Dimitroff.

Original songs 
As a general rule that went unbroken in all of their seventeen animated films, each film featured three original songs performed by a variety of singers. Jetlag Productions' successor for GoodTimes Entertainment, Blye Migicovsky Productions, continued this trend in their films. The instrumental bases to these original songs were sometimes used as part of the soundtrack outside the main musical numbers, as was the case in Hercules (1995) and Little Red Riding Hood (1995), among others. Though these musical numbers were placed into the films in often formulaic patterns, there were a few exceptions: A Christmas Carol (1994) was the only film to not feature an opening musical number, while Hercules (1995) was unusual in that it ended with an instrumental version of "Son of Zeus" rather than a vocal version. Though the vast majority of the songs were performed by off-screen voices, Snow White (1995)'s "Hip Hip Hooray", Magic Gift of the Snowman (1995)'s "Sleep and Dream", Cinderella (1994)'s "(It's the) Chance of a Lifetime", and Leo the Lion: King of the Jungle (1994)'s "Out on My Own" were sung by actual characters within the films; Cinderella (1994)'s "When Love Has Gone Away" was the only duet performed by characters from the film, sung by Cinderella and the prince, respectively.

Musicians 
The credits attributed to the different composers and writers of the original soundtrack were listed in a formulaic manner in all seventeen animated productions, and were thus never associated with their actual compositions or performances.  Among these credits, the following artists were credited as:
Music producer: Andrew Dimitroff
Composers: Nick Carr, Ray Crossley and Andrew Dimitroff
Lyricist: Joellyn Cooperman

Credited musicians 
Ray Crossley
Andrew Dimitroff
Milcho Leviev
Mel Steinberg
Leslie Woodbury

Uncredited vocalist performers 
Kathleen Barr (as the singing voice of Tooey in Leo the Lion: King of the Jungle (1994), performing "Out on My Own")
Garry Chalk (as the voice of Leo in Leo the Lion: King of the Jungle (1994), performing "I'm a Really Nice Guy")
Wendy K. Hamilton-Caddey (for songs such as "A Little Bit of Magic," "The Season of Love," "Keep Christmas in Your Heart", and "Land of Pocahontas", among others)

External links 
 

Anime-influenced Western animation
American animation studios
Companies established in the 1990s